Carex kulingana is a tussock-forming species of perennial sedge in the family Cyperaceae. It is native to south eastern parts of China.

See also
List of Carex species

References

kulingana
Taxa named by Liberty Hyde Bailey
Plants described in 1920
Flora of China